Valerie Gail Zakian Carter (February 5, 1953 – March 4, 2017) was an American singer.

Biography
Carter began her career singing in coffeehouses as a teenager, and eventually became one-third of the country-folk band Howdy Moon. Though they debuted at the legendary Troubadour in Los Angeles, California, in 1974, their one album is now fairly obscure. It is notable, however, for the Carter-penned song "Cook with Honey", later a hit for Judy Collins, and for the introduction of Carter to Lowell George, who produced the next album. He would be a mentor to her until his death in 1979 and introduced her to Jackson Browne, James Taylor, and many of the artists she would work with throughout her career.

Her first solo album, Just a Stone's Throw Away, featured an impressive array of guest artists from the 1970s Southern California music scene including Maurice White, Lowell George, Linda Ronstadt, Jackson Browne, and Deniece Williams. The album was well received and garnered favorable reviews and placed her as the opening act for the Eagles in Europe. Two years later, she released another album Wild Child, and began touring with various artists primarily James Taylor, Jackson Browne, and Linda Ronstadt.

Carter then released another solo album, The Way It Is, with guest artists including Phoebe Snow, Lyle Lovett, Edwin McCain, James Taylor, Linda Ronstadt, and Jackson Browne. Japan released a limited edition of this CD with an additional song by Tom Snow.

She followed two years later with EPs Find a River, Vanilla Grits, and a compilation CD Midnight Over Honey River.

Other work
Carter worked as a backup vocalist for a number of famous recording artists. These included Linda Ronstadt, Don Henley, Christopher Cross, Little Feat, Jackson Browne, the Outlaws, and James Taylor.

Carter wrote the song "Cook with Honey" which was a hit for Judy Collins on her 1973 album True Stories and Other Dreams. Carter also co-wrote the Jackson Browne track "Love Needs a Heart" that was featured on his 1977 album Running on Empty.  She also co-wrote "It is One" and "Niño" on Browne's album Looking East. She worked as a writer for the Brothers Johnson on the track "Deceiver", Earth, Wind & Fire's "Turn It Into Something Good", featured on the band's 1980 album Faces, and Cher's Black Rose band's "Never Should've Started".

In 1978, she performed the singing voice of the character Jan Mouse in the animated Halloween special The Devil and Daniel Mouse produced by Canadian animation studio Nelvana. She was credited under the pseudonym Laurel Runn, likely inspired by living in Laurel Canyon at the time. She sang several songs in the special, including a duet with singer John Sebastian of the Lovin' Spoonful fame. The following year, in 1979, her cover of "O-o-h Child" was featured in Matt Dillon's film debut in Over the Edge.

In 2018, her sister Jan Carter and her friend Kathy Kurasch assembled The Lost Tapes; the first posthumous stand-alone album of previously unreleased material by Carter. It includes unreleased tracks recorded during her career including "I Got Over It", co-written by Prince.

Personal life and death
In the issue of Billboard on December 11, 1999, a marriage was announced between Carter and Seth Katz, a television executive with Sony, taking place on November 26, 1999, in Montclair, New Jersey.

In August and October 2009, Carter was arrested in St. Petersburg, Florida, for possession of drugs.  She completed all of the court's requirements on May 25, 2011. American singer-songwriter James Taylor appeared at her drug court graduation ceremonies in a congratulatory effort on behalf of all of the graduates.

Carter died of a heart attack on March 4, 2017, at the age of 64.

The song "Valerie", recorded by Steve Winwood, was reportedly about her, as was Jackson Browne's song "That Girl Could Sing".

Discography

Collaboration albums
 Howdy Moon (1974)

Studio albums
 Just a Stone's Throw Away (1977)
 Wild Child (1978)
 The Way It Is (1996; reissued 2006)
 Find a River (1998; EP)
 Midnight Over Honey River (2003) 
 The Lost Tapes (2018)
 Valerie Carter with Yoshiyuki Sahashi – Live in Tokyo, 1994 (2020)

Compilation albums
 Ooh Child: The Columbia Years (2019)
 Vanilla Grits (2001)

Guest appearances
Aaron Neville – Warm Your Heart (1991)
Al Kooper – Championship Wrestling (1982)
Anna Vissi – Everything I Am (2001)
Anne Murray – Anne Murray (1996)
Arnold McCuller – Circa 1990 (2003)
Aselin Debison – Sweet Is the Melody (2002)
Christopher Cross – Christopher Cross (1980)
Curtis Stigers – Brighter Days (1999)
Diana Ross – Force Behind the Power (1991)
Don Grusin – 10k-La (1980)
Don Henley:
 The End of the Innocence (1989)
 Inside Job (2000)
Eddie Money – Playing for Keeps (1980)
Eric Carmen – Change of Heart (1978)
Freebo – End of the Beginning (1999)
Glenn Frey – Strange Weather (1992)
Hoyt Axton – Southbound (1975)
Jackson Browne:
 I'm Alive (1993)
 Looking East (1996)
James Taylor:
 Gorilla (1975)
 In the Pocket (1976)
 New Moon Shine (1991)
 Live (1993)
 Best Live (1994)
 Hourglass (1997)
 Greatest Hits Volume 2 (2000)
Jimmy Webb:
 Angel Heart (1982)
 Suspending Disbelief (1993)
Jorge Calderón – City Music (1975)
Jude Johnstone – Coming of Age (2002)
Julia Fordham – Swept (1991)
Julie Miller:
 Orphans & Angels (1993)
 Invisible Girl (1996)
Keiko Matsui – Sapphire (1995)
Linda Ronstadt:
 Winter Light (1994)
 Feels Like Home (1995)
 Dedicated to the One I Love (1996)
Little Feat – The Last Record Album (1975)
Lyle Lovett – Road to Ensenada (1996)
Maureen McCormick – When You Get a Little Lonely (1995)
Neil Diamond:
 Lovescape (1991)
 Up on the Roof: Songs from the Brill Building (1993)
 Christmas Album, Vol. 2 (1994)
 In My Lifetime (1996)
Nicolette Larson:
 Nicolette (1978)
 All Dressed Up and No Place to Go (1982)
Ofra Haza – Kirya (1992)
Jack Wagner – Love Can Take Us All the Way (1986)
Randy Newman – Born Again (1979)
Rick Derringer – Free Ride (2002)
Ringo Starr – Time Takes Time (1992)
Shawn Colvin – Fat City (1992)
Tom Jans – Eyes of an Only Child (1975)
Tom Kell – Dove (2012)
Vonda Shepard – Songs from Ally McBeal (1998)
Willie Nelson – Healing Hands of Time (1994)

Songwriting credits
 "Cook with Honey" – Judy Collins (True Stories and Other Dreams, 1973)
"Love Needs a Heart" – Jackson Browne (Running on Empty, 1977)
"Turn It into Something Good" – Earth, Wind & Fire (Faces, 1980)
"Never Should Have Started" – Black Rose (Black Rose, 1980)
 "Deceiver" – The Brothers Johnson (released as B-side of 7" single "You Keep Me Coming Back", 1984)
 "It Is One" – Jackson Browne (Looking East, 1996)
"Nino" – Jackson Browne (Looking East, 1996)

References

External links
 Official website
 Archive of old website (archived from September 2013)
 

1953 births
2017 deaths
American women singers
Songwriters from Florida
People from Winter Haven, Florida
American women songwriters
21st-century American women
American soft rock musicians
American soul singers